James Walker Ross (March 18, 1885 – January 16, 1941) was a Canadian politician.

Born in Athelstan (Hinchinbrooke), Quebec, Ross was elected to the Legislative Assembly of Quebec for Huntingdon in 1939. A Liberal, he died in office in 1941.

References

1885 births
1941 deaths
Quebec Liberal Party MNAs
People from Montérégie